Kathleen Charlotte McInerney, also known by her stage name Veronica Taylor, is an American voice actress known for her dubbing work in English-language adaptations of Japanese anime, in particular for voicing Ash Ketchum and his mother Delia in the Pokémon anime for its first eight seasons. Other voices she has done include Amelia Wil Tesla Seyruun from Slayers, Sailor Pluto from Sailor Moon and Sailor Moon Crystal, Nico Robin in the 4Kids dub of One Piece, April O'Neil in the 2003 Teenage Mutant Ninja Turtles series and has voiced video game characters like Cosmos from Dissidia 012 Final Fantasy, Dissidia Final Fantasy and Dissidia Final Fantasy NT. Additionally, using her real name, she is a narrator for various audio books, such as the fourth arc from the Warriors series.

Early life 
Taylor wanted to act professionally since she was in her first play when she was five. She studied acting at The Catholic University of America and Brandeis University. She worked as a teacher at Pigeon Forge High School for a year while starting her voice-acting career.

Career
Taylor was featured in numerous plays and toured with National Players under the leadership of William H. Graham, the chairman of Catholic U's Drama Department, and other stage companies in the Washington, D.C. area and other cities all around the United States for a few years before settling in New York.
 
Her other roles include Ash Ketchum, his mother Delia, and May in the 4Kids dub of the Pokémon anime series, April O'Neil from the 2003 Teenage Mutant Ninja Turtles series, Amelia Wil Tesla Seyruun in the Slayers TV series, voice of Mangchi in the English dub of Hammerboy, the voice of Nico Robin in the 4Kids dub of One Piece, and the voice of Sailor Pluto in the Viz Media dub of Sailor Moon and Sailor Moon Crystal.

Taylor has also narrated audio books written by Judy Blume, Wendy Mass, Danielle Steel, Linda Castillo, Russell Ginns, Louise Erdrich and Mary Kay Andrews among others. She has also narrated for Gayle Foreman.

Personal life
Taylor has one daughter, Rena, born in 1998. After living in New York City, New York, she relocated to Los Angeles, California in 2015.

Taylor has developed strong ties to the Washington, D.C. area and to Boston: playing women's soccer for the Catholic University Cardinals; and being a Commanders, Capitals and Red Sox fan. (She lived in the same Arlington neighborhood as legendary wide receiver Art Monk.) Both of her parents attended Catholic University and toured with National Players as well.

Filmography

Film

Television

Video games

Audiobook Narration

Live-action

References

External links

 Veronica Taylor's official web site
 
 
  (Veronica Taylor as Kathleen McInerney)
  (Veronica Taylor as B Simpson)
  (Veronica Taylor as Joan Arkin)
 
 
 Veronica Taylor on Instagram

Place of birth missing (living people)
Living people
20th-century American actresses
21st-century American actresses
Actresses from New York City
American video game actresses
American voice actresses
Audiobook narrators
Brandeis University alumni
Catholic University of America alumni
Pokémon
Year of birth missing (living people)